Quentalia crenulosa is a moth in the family Bombycidae. It was described by Harrison Gray Dyar Jr. in 1918. It is found in Mexico.

References

Arctiidae genus list at Butterflies and Moths of the World of the Natural History Museum

Bombycidae
Moths described in 1918